Lorenzo Dini (born 2 October 1994) is an Italian long-distance runner who competed at one edition of the IAAF World Half Marathon Championships at senior level (2018). He has a twin, also athlete, named Samuele.

Achievements

He won the national title on 10 km road in Canelli on 8 September 2019.

National titles
 Italian Athletics Championships
 10 km road: 2019 in Canelli

See also
 Italy at the 2018 European Athletics Championships

References

External links

1994 births
Living people
Italian male long-distance runners
Italian twins
Twin sportspeople
Athletics competitors of Fiamme Gialle
Athletes (track and field) at the 2018 Mediterranean Games
Italian Athletics Championships winners
Italian male cross country runners
Mediterranean Games competitors for Italy
21st-century Italian people